The Korean International School Philippines (Pilipin Hanguk Gukje Hakgyo), is an international school, the school in Bonifacio Global City, Taguig, Metro Manila, Philippines which follows a Korean school curriculum and uses Korean as a medium of instruction.

See also

Philippines–South Korea relations

References

External links
Korean International School Philippines official website 

Philippines–South Korea relations
Philippines
International schools in Metro Manila
Education in Bonifacio Global City
Educational institutions established in 2002
2002 establishments in the Philippines